Sylvia is a 1961 TV ballet broadcast by the Australian Broadcasting Corporation. It was directed by Christopher Muir.

Premise
A ballet set in ancient Greece. The love of Aminta for Sylvia.

Cast
Laurence Bishop as Eros
Janet Karin as Sylvia
Ray Trickett as Orlon
Garth Welch as Aminta

References

External links

Australian television plays
Australian television plays based on ballets
Australian Broadcasting Corporation original programming
English-language television shows
1961 television plays